The Cortland Sport Management Department is an academic department at the State University of New York (SUNY) at Cortland. The department features the only undergraduate and graduate sport management degree programs in the SUNY system. Cortland Sport Management, which has a focus on information technology, digital media in sport, and the internationalization of sport, and prepares students for careers in sport business through a theory-to-practice model of learning. The department houses the Sport Media and Technology Learning Center and the Dartfish USA Northeast Training Center. The student-run Cortland Sport Management Club is one of the largest student organizations on campus.

Faculty 
Notable faculty who have been a part of the Cortland Sport Management department:

Current faculty
Dr. Ted Fay
Dr. Justin Lovich
Dr. Tara Mahoney
Dr. Erin Morris
Dr. Ryan Vooris
Genevieve Birren, Esq.
Lawrence Brady
Megan Cross
Tamara Demeree-Lindhosrt
Mark Dodds
Kerry Fischer
James Forshee
Peter Han
Jordan Kobritz
Matthew Seyfried
George Vazenios

Former faculty
Lisa Scherer
Dr. Kevin Heisey
David Snyder
Dr. James Reese
Dr. Luisa Velez
Daniel DePerno
Tara Derbick
Dr. Susan Rayl
Dr. Yomee Lee
Dr. Joel Maxcy
Jason Smorol
Joe Manhertz
David Benson

Cortland Sport Management Club 
The sport management club at the State University of New York College at Cortland, whose members are sport management majors and minors, is the largest student-run club on campus. Supported by the Cortland Student Government Association, the Cortland Sport Management Club provides students with opportunities to work at and run sports-related events, travel on educational field trips to sports venues and gain industry experience with their peers.

The Cortland Sport Management Club runs the sport management department's three major events each academic year: the Wingate Memorial Golf Tournament in September, the Annual Sport Management Conference and the Annual Sport Management Awards Ceremony in April. The club also designs and sells merchandise related to the annual Cortaca Jug football game, a matchup between Cortland and Ithaca College that was referred to by Sports Illustrated as the "Biggest Little Game in the Country." The Cortaca Jug T-shirt sales proceeds go to the Dolores "Dee" Bogard Scholarship.

Club members have traveled to New York, Buffalo, Toronto, Syracuse, Philadelphia and Cooperstown for behind-the-scenes tours of sport facilities. The club officers are elected by the students each year, and the organization holds open meetings on campus each week. The club goes on educational outings to stadiums and sports landmarks such as:

National Baseball Hall of Fame in Cooperstown, New York
HSBC Arena in Buffalo, New York
Air Canada Centre in Toronto, Ontario
Carrier Dome in Syracuse, New York
Ralph Wilson Stadium in Orchard Park, New York
NBT Bank Stadium in Syracuse, New York
Schoellkopf Field in Ithaca, New York
Fenway Park in Boston, Massachusetts
Shea Stadium in Flushing, New York
Lincoln Financial Field in Philadelphia, Pennsylvania
Madison Square Garden in New York, New York
Nassau Coliseum in Uniondale, New York
FedExField in Prince George's County, Maryland
Verizon Center in Washington, D.C.

Club officers for 2008 
 President – Taryn Donovan
 Vice president – Deana Lykos
 Secretary – Shirley Tyler
 Treasurer – Angela Calvano

Club officers for 2009 

 President – Scott Hill
 Vice president – Nathan Fisher
 Secretary – Megan Lupini
 Treasurer – Eli Roberge

Club officers for 2010 

 President – Pedro Suarez
 Vice president – Nico Ruggiero
 Secretary – Kelly Grogan
 Treasurer – Eli Roberge

Club officers for 2011 

President – Kelly Grogan/Nico Ruggiero
Vice president – Nico Ruggiero
Treasurer – Brianna Dammers

Club officers for 2012 

President – David Barnick
Vice president – Christopher DePalma
Secretary – Alexa Rudik
Treasurer – Saige Kashan

Awards ceremony 
The club annually holds an awards ceremony to recognize student achievement.  Each year, a keynote speaker addresses the crowd.  Past speakers include:
 2001 Steve Tasker, Buffalo Bills
 2002 Andre Taylor, entrepreneur consultant
 2003 Mark Murphy, Washington Redskins
 2004 Dr. Donna Lopiano, Executive director of the Women’s Sports Foundation
 2005 Dick Pound, former vice-president of the International Olympic Committee
 2006 Val Ackerman, first president of the Women's National Basketball Association (WNBA)
 2007 Mike Veeck, owner of several minor league baseball
 2008 Anucha Browne Sanders, former marketing executive for the New York Knicks
 2009 Ethan Zohn, Survivor (US TV series) winner
 2010 Awista Ayub, Author and Founder of the Afghan Youth Sports Exchange
 2011 Brian Holloway, former 5-time NFL All-Pro Offensive Lineman, current renowned corporate trainer

Walk A Thon 
2008 was the first year of the Cortland Sport Management Club Walk A Thon.  The Walk A Thon was a success raiding over $2,000 for the Jimmy V Foundation for Cancer Research. For more information on the 2009 Walk A Thon see club website.

Cortaca Jug T-shirt sales 
The Cortland Sport Management Club is the only organization that owns the sole rights and trademarks to the Cortaca Jug name and symbols. That being said one of the club's major fundraisers every year is the sale of the official Cortaca Jug T-shirts For more information on Cortaca Jug T-shirt sales see club website.

Conference 
The club periodically hosts a conference focusing on a key sports business topic.  Past conferences include:
 2001 Sport Law Conference (Notable presenters included Len Elmore, Peter Schaffer, Ken Shropshire)
 2002 Info Tech in Sport Conference (Keynote speaker Vic Carucci of NFL.com)
 2005 Disability in Sport Festival and Symposium (Keynote speaker, paralympian and world-renowned adventure athlete Mark Wellman)
 2007 Extreme Sports Conference (Keynote speaker Cara-Beth Burnside)

Lose the Shoes 
The club held the first ever SUNY Cortland "Lose the Shoes" soccer tournament in 2009 to benefit Grassroots Soccer, an organization created by Survivor Winner Ethan Zohn to spread AIDS awareness in Africa.  The annual event draws students from several other schools and raises thousands of dollars each year for charity.

Wingate Golf Tournament 
For the last 20 years, the club has hosted the Suzanne Wingate Memorial Golf Tournament.  The tournament is named after former SUNY Cortland professor Dr. Suzanne Wingate. Wingate, who was an avid golfer, is credited with founding the college’s Sport Management program and worked there from 1985 until her death from cancer in 1995.  While proceeds from the tournament had benefitted the Suzanne Wingate Memorial Scholarship Fund for 15 years, the scholarship has recently become endowed.  Tournament profits are now donated to local youth organizations in need within the community, with the recipient varying each year.

References 
 http://www.cortland.edu/spmg
 http://www.dartfishtraining.com
 http://web.cortland.edu/spmgclub/

State University of New York at Cortland